Zawisza or Záviš is a Slavic name and may refer to:

People 
 Zawisza Czarny (1379–1428), known as Zawisza the Black, a famous Polish medieval knight and diplomat
 Zawisza Czerwony (died 1433), known as Zawisza the Red, a less famous but notable contemporary of Zawisza Czarny
 Artur Zawisza (born 1969), a Polish politician
 Marcelina Zawisza (born 1989), a Polish politician
 Oskar Zawisza (1878–1933), a Polish Catholic priest, composer and educational activist
 Záviš of Zápy (1350–1411), a Czech theologian and composer
 Záviš, a well known name of Czech singer Milan Smrčka (born 1956)
 Záviš Kalandra (1902–1950), a Czech historian who was executed by Communists
 Zavis of Falkenstein (1250–1290), a Czech nobleman
 Zawisza (Szare Szeregi), the youngest Scouts, known for their resistance work during the Warsaw Uprising

Other 
 Zawisza Bydgoszcz, a sports club from Bydgoszcz, Poland
 Zawisza Pajęczno, a soccer club in Pajęczno, Poland
 Zawisza Rzgów, a sports club from Rzgów, Poland
 Zawisza Czarny (ship), the name of two sailing ships owned by the Polish Scouting and Guiding Association

Czech masculine given names
Polish masculine given names
Polish-language surnames
Slovak masculine given names
Slavic masculine given names

pl:Zawisza